Francellis Montas Luna (born March 21, 1993) is a Dominican professional baseball pitcher for the New York Yankees of Major League Baseball (MLB). He has previously played in MLB for the Chicago White Sox and Oakland Athletics.

Montas signed as an international free agent with the Boston Red Sox in 2009, and was traded to the White Sox in 2013. He made his MLB debut in 2015, and was traded to the Los Angeles Dodgers after the season. After missing time due to injuries, the Dodgers traded Montas to the Athletics during the season. Montas established himself as a major league pitcher for Oakland in 2017, and was traded to the Yankees in 2022.

Career

Boston Red Sox (2009–2013)
Montas signed as an amateur free agent with the Boston Red Sox in 2009, receiving a $75,000 signing bonus. He played in the minor leagues for the Red Sox' organization for the Gulf Coast Red Sox and Lowell Spinners in 2012, and for the Greenville Drive in 2013.

Chicago White Sox (2013–2015)
Before the 2013 trade deadline, the Red Sox traded Montas and fellow minor leaguers J. B. Wendelken and Cleuluis Rondon to the Chicago White Sox in a three-team trade, where Jake Peavy went from the White Sox to the Red Sox, José Iglesias went from the Red Sox to the Detroit Tigers, Avisaíl García went from the Tigers to the White Sox, and Brayan Villarreal went from the Tigers to the Red Sox. The White Sox assigned Montas to the Kannapolis Intimidators, also in the South Atlantic League.

Montas began the 2014 season with the Winston-Salem Dash of the Class A-Advanced Carolina League. He was named to appear in the 2014 All-Star Futures Game, but suffered an injury to the meniscus in his knee which required surgery, and withdrew from the game. After rehabilitating, Montas pitched for the Birmingham Barons of the Class AA Southern League. He finished the 2014 season with a combined 5–0 win–loss record and a 1.44 earned run average.

The White Sox assigned Montas to the Arizona Fall League after the 2014 season. On November 20, 2014, the White Sox added Montas to their 40-man roster. He returned to Birmingham for the 2015 season, and threw a seven-inning no hitter on June 9. He appeared in the Southern League All-Star Game and the All-Star Futures Game. The White Sox promoted Montas to the major leagues on July 17, 2015, to be their 26th man during that day's doubleheader. He returned to Birmingham the next day without appearing in either game. The White Sox promoted Montas again on September 1, and he made his major league debut as a relief pitcher the next day.

Los Angeles Dodgers (2016)
On December 16, 2015, Montas, along with Micah Johnson and Trayce Thompson, were traded to the Los Angeles Dodgers as part of a three team trade that sent Todd Frazier to the White Sox and José Peraza, Brandon Dixon and Scott Schebler to the Cincinnati Reds. On February 12, 2016, the Dodgers announced that Montas underwent rib resection surgery and would miss up to four months of the season. He made his first appearance of 2016 with the Tulsa Drillers of the Class AA Texas League on May 22. After a couple of rehab appearances for the Drillers, he was assigned to the AAA Oklahoma City Dodgers. He aggravated his rib injury and further testing concluded he had a broken rib and he would miss a month or two of the season recovering.

Oakland Athletics (2016–2022)
On August 1, 2016, the Dodgers traded Montas, Jharel Cotton, and Grant Holmes to the Oakland Athletics in exchange for Josh Reddick and Rich Hill. After not getting a call to the majors in 2016, he appeared in 23 games for the A's in 2017, allowing 25 runs in 32 innings (7.03 ERA), while compiling a 1–1 record. For the 2018 season, Montas reverted to being a starter, beginning the season at the AAA level. He appeared in 13 games (11 starts) with the A's during the season, compiling a 5–4 record with a 3.88 ERA.

On June 21, 2019, after starting the season 9–2 with a 2.70 ERA in 15 games (all starts), Montas was suspended 80 games without pay for testing positive for a banned substance, ostarine, in violation of MLB's Joint Drug Prevention and Treatment Program. In 2020, Montas began the season as the A's Opening day starter. Through the season, Montas struggled with command as he recorded a win–loss record of 3-5 and an ERA of 5.60 in 11 starts.

On February 19, 2021, Montas was placed on the COVID-19 related injury list after testing positive for the virus. He finished the 2021 season with a 13–9 record, a 3.37 ERA and 207 strikeouts in 187 innings, finishing sixth in American League Cy Young Award voting.

On March 22, 2022, Montas signed a $5.025 million contract with the A's, avoiding salary arbitration.

New York Yankees (2022–present)
The Athletics traded Montas and Lou Trivino to the New York Yankees for JP Sears, Ken Waldichuk, Luis Medina, and Cooper Bowman on August 1, 2022. He made his first start with the Yankees on August 7, 2022, allowing 6 runs in 3 innings.

On January 14, 2023, it was announced that Montas would likely miss the first month of the season with right shoulder inflammation. On February 15, it was announced that Montas would require arthroscopic surgery on his right shoulder and would miss the majority of the 2023 season.

See also
List of Major League Baseball players suspended for performance-enhancing drugs

References

External links

1993 births
Living people
Arizona League White Sox players
Birmingham Barons players
Chicago White Sox players
Dominican Republic expatriate baseball players in the United States
Dominican Republic sportspeople in doping cases
Dominican Summer League Red Sox players
Greenville Drive players
Gulf Coast Red Sox players
Kannapolis Intimidators players
Leones del Escogido players
Lowell Spinners players
Major League Baseball pitchers
Major League Baseball players from the Dominican Republic
Major League Baseball players suspended for drug offenses
Nashville Sounds players
New York Yankees players
Oakland Athletics players
Oklahoma City Dodgers players
People from San Cristóbal Province
Tulsa Drillers players
Winston-Salem Dash players